Kattemalalavadi  is a village in the southern state of Karnataka, India. It is located in the Hunsur taluk of Mysore district in Karnataka.

Demographics
As of 2001 India census, Kattemalalavadi had a population of 5451 with 2734 males and 2717 females.

See also
 Mysore
 Districts of Karnataka

References

External links

Villages in Mysore district